Robert "Bobby" Meyer is a retired American soccer defender who played professionally in the USL A-League.

Meyer attended Dartmouth College, playing for the Mean Green from 1995 to 1998.  He was a 1998 Third Team All American.  On February 7, 1999, the Colorado Rapids selected Meyer in the third round (thirty-second overall) of the 1999 MLS College Draft.  The Rapids waived Meyer on March 25, 1999.  Meyer then signed with the Pittsburgh Riverhounds who had selected him in the second round of the 1999 USL draft.  He spent two seasons in Pittsburgh, then sat out the 2001 season.  He signed with the Cincinnati Riverhawks in March 2002.  He spent a season and a half with the Riverhawks.  On June 25, 2003, the Riverhawks cancelled his contract “by mutual consent”.

References

Living people
American soccer players
Cincinnati Riverhawks players
Colorado Rapids players
Dartmouth Big Green men's soccer players
Pittsburgh Riverhounds SC players
A-League (1995–2004) players
Colorado Rapids draft picks
Association football defenders
Year of birth missing (living people)